The JKFA Professional League 2021 is the inaugural season of the JKFA Professional League, the first professional league in the Indian state of Jammu and Kashmir. It is organised by Jammu and Kashmir Football Association and J&K Sports Council. 

The inaugural season kicked off on July 12th, with 8 teams competing for the maiden title and qualification for the I-League 2nd Division. The 8 teams will play once against each other in a round-robin format. The Top 2 clubs will be nominated for I-League 2nd Division.

Teams
A total of 8 teams participated in the league.

Foreign Players

Standings

References 

Football in Jammu and Kashmir
3
2021–22 in Indian football